The Ministry of Transport and Highways is the central government ministry of Sri Lanka responsible for transport. The ministry is responsible for formulating and implementing national policy on transport and other subjects which come under its purview. The current Minister of Transport and Highways is Bandula Gunawardane. The ministry's secretary is Nihal Somaweera.

Ministers
The Minister of Transport and Highways is a member of the Cabinet of Sri Lanka.

Secretaries

References

External links
 

 
Transport and Highways
Transport and Highways
 
Sri Lanka
Sri Lanka
1931 establishments in Ceylon
Civil aviation in Sri Lanka
Transport organisations based in Sri Lanka
Members of the Board of Ministers of Ceylon